Teresa Suchecka-Nowak (1926–2011), was Polish World War II underground fighter, member of Home Army and participant of the Warsaw Uprising.

During the Warsaw Uprising, she was a nurse and a soldier of the 3rd platoon, company B-3 of the "Bałtyk" battalion of the Home Army "Baszta" regiment. For her participation in the attack and capture of a German ammunition car, she was promoted to the rank of senior gunner and awarded the Cross of Valour.

In 1997, she became the godmother of the banner of the Regiment of Protection. Maj. Gen. Boleslaw Wieniawa-Dlugoszowski.

Awards and decorations
Her awards and decorations include:
Commander's Cross of the Order of Polonia Restituta
Armia Krajowa Cross
Warsaw Cross of the Uprising
Cross of Valour (Poland)

References

1926 births
2011 deaths

Warsaw Uprising insurgents
Home Army members
Recipients of the Cross of Valour (Poland)
Commanders of the Order of Polonia Restituta
Women in World War II